Word painting, also known as tone painting or text painting, is the musical technique of composing music that reflects the literal meaning of a song's lyrics or story elements in programmatic music.

Historical development
Tone painting of words goes at least as far back as Gregorian chant. Musical patterns expressed both emotive ideas and theological meanings in these chants. For instance, the pattern fa-mi-sol-la signifies the humiliation and death of Christ and his resurrection into glory. Fa-mi signifies deprecation, while sol is the note of the resurrection, and la is above the resurrection, His heavenly glory ("surrexit Jesus"). Such musical words are placed on words from the Biblical Latin text; for instance when fa-mi-sol-la is placed on "et libera" (e.g., introit for Sexagesima Sunday) in the Christian faith it signifies that Christ liberates us from sin through his death and resurrection.

Word painting developed especially in the late 16th century among Italian and English composers of madrigals, to such an extent that word painting devices came to be called madrigalisms. While it originated in secular music, it made its way into other vocal music of the period. While this mannerism became a prominent feature of madrigals of the late 16th century, including both Italian and English, it encountered sharp criticism from some composers. Thomas Campion, writing in the preface to his first book of lute songs in 1601, said of it: "... where the nature of everie word is precisely expresst in the Note … such childish observing of words is altogether ridiculous."

Word painting flourished well into the Baroque music period. One well-known example occurs in Handel's Messiah, where a tenor aria contains Handel's setting of the text:

Every valley shall be exalted, and every mountain and hill made low; the crooked straight, and the rough places plain. (Isaiah 40:4)

In Handel's melody, the word "valley" ends on a low note, "exalted" is a rising figure; "mountain" forms a peak in the melody, and "hill" a smaller one, while "low" is another low note. "Crooked" is sung to a rapid figure of four different notes, while "straight" is sung on a single note, and in "the rough places plain", "the rough places" is sung over short, separate notes whereas the final word "plain" is extended over several measures in a series of long notes. This can be seen in the following example:

In popular music

There are countless examples of word painting in 20th century music.

One example occurs in the song "Friends in Low Places" by Garth Brooks. During the chorus, Brooks sings the word "low" on a low note. Similarly, on The Who's album Tommy, the song "Smash the Mirror" contains the line "Rise, rise, rise, rise, rise, rise, rise, rise, rise, rise, rise, rise, rise...." Each repetition of "rise" is a semitone higher than the last, making this an especially overt example of word-painting.

"Hallelujah" by Leonard Cohen includes another example of word painting. In the line "It goes like this the fourth, the fifth, the minor fall and the major lift, the baffled king composing hallelujah," the lyrics signify the song's chord progression.

Justin Timberlake's song "What Goes Around" is another popular example of text painting. The lyrics

What goes around, goes around, goes around
Comes all the way back around

descend an octave and then return to the upper octave, as though it was going around in a circle.

In the chorus of "Up Where We Belong" recorded by Joe Cocker and Jennifer Warnes, the melody rises during the words "Love lift us up".

In Johnny Cash's "Ring of Fire", there is an inverse word painting where "down, down, down" is sung to the notes rising, and 'higher' is sung dropping from a higher to a lower note.

In Jim Reeves's version of the Joe Allison and Audrey Allison song "He'll Have to Go," the singer's voice sinks on the last word of the line, "I'll tell the man to turn the juke box way down low."

When Warren Zevon sings "I think I'm sinking down," on his song "Carmelita," his voice sinks on the word "down."

In Richard Rodgers and Lorenz Hart's "My Romance," the melody jumps to a higher note on the word "rising" in the line "My romance doesn't need a castle rising in Spain."

In recordings of George and Ira Gershwin's "They Can't Take That Away from Me," Ella Fitzgerald and others intentionally sing the wrong note on the word "key" in the phrase "the way you sing off-key".

Another inverse happens during the song "A Spoonful of Sugar" from Mary Poppins, as, during the line "Just a spoonful of sugar helps the medicine go down," the words "go down" leap from a lower to a higher note.

In Follies, Stephen Sondheim's first time composing the words and music together, the number "Who's That Woman?" contains the line "Who's been riding for a fall?" followed by a downward glissando and bass bump, and then the line "Who is she who plays the clown?" followed by mocking saxophone wobbles.

At the beginning of the first chorus in Luis Fonsi's "Despacito", the music is slowed down when the word "despacito'"(slowly) is performed.

In Secret Garden's "You Raise Me Up", the words "you raise me up" are sung in a rising scale at the beginning of the chorus.

Queen use word painting in many of their songs (in particular, those written by lead singer Freddie Mercury). In "Somebody to Love", each time the word "Lord" occurs, it is sung as the highest note at the end of an ascending passage. In the same piece, the lyrics "I've got no rhythm; I just keep losing my beat" fall on off beats to create the impression that he is out of time.

Queen also uses word painting through music recording technology in their song "Killer Queen" where a flanger effect is placed on the vocals during the word "laser-beam" in bar 17.

In Mariah Carey's 1991 single Emotions word painting is used throughout the song. The first use of word painting is in the lyric "deeper than I've ever dreamed of" where she sings down to the bottom of the staff, another example is also in the lyric "You make me feel so high" with the word "high" being sung with arpeggios with the last note being an E7

In Miley Cyrus’ ‘Wrecking Ball’, every time the title of the song is mentioned, all instruments engage in one huge wall of sound, therefore mimicking the sound of a wrecking ball whenever the chorus comes in.

Burt Bacharach uses word-painting in the song ‘In Between the Heartaches’ from Dionne Warwick’s Here_I_Am album. The song opens on an A-flat minor 11th chord.  Dionne sings on the 11th of the chord (on the words…’In Between…’); a high E-flat briefly (on the word ‘the’); and back to the 11th and the 9th of the chord (on the word…’Heartaches…’) Those notes fall IN BETWEEN the notes of an A-flat minor triad (A-flat, C-flat, E-flat) making it a highly sophisticated example of word-painting.

See also
 Mickey Mousing
 Musica reservata
 Program music
 Eye music

References

Sources
 M. Clement Morin and Robert M. Fowells, "Gregorian Musical Words", in Choral essays: A Tribute to Roger Wagner, edited by Williams Wells Belan, San Carlos (CA): Thomas House Publications, 1993
 Sadie, Stanley. Word Painting. Carter, Tim. The New Grove Dictionary of Music and Musicians. Second edition, vol. 27.
 How to Listen to and Understand Great Music, Part 1, Disc 6, Robert Greenberg, San Francisco Conservatory of Music

Musical techniques